NGC 3001 is a magnitude 11.83 spiral galaxy in the constellation Antlia, discovered on 30 March 1835 by John Herschel. NGC 3001 has an apparent size of 4.3 by 3.1 arcminutes and is about 145 thousand light years across.

References

External links 
 

Astronomical objects discovered in 1835
Discoveries by John Herschel
Galaxies discovered in 1835
3001
Barred spiral galaxies
Antlia
028027